Archimedes (c. 287 BC – c. 212 BC) is the eponym of all of the things (and topics) listed below.

Mathematical concepts 

Archimedean absolute value
Archimedean circle
Archimedean copula
Archimedean group
Archimedean ordered field
Archimedean point
Archimedean property
Archimedean solid
Archimedean spiral
Archimedean tiling
Archimedes' axiom
Archimedes' cattle problem
Archimedes' hat-box theorem
Archimedes constant
Archimedes number
Archimedes' quadruplets
Archimedes Square
Archimedes' twin circles
Heron–Archimedes formula
Non-Archimedean geometry
Non-Archimedean ordered field
Archimedes' ostomachion

Physical concepts 

Archimedes paradox
Archimedes' principle

Technology

Things invented by Archimedes 

Archimedes' pulley
Archimedes' screw
Archimedean turbine
Archimedes heat ray
Claw of Archimedes
Trammel of Archimedes

Other 

Archimedes bridge
Archimede combined cycle power plant
SS Archimedes
Archimedes Group

Computer hardware and software 

Archimedes (CAD)
Archimedes Geo3D
Acorn Archimedes
GNU Archimedes

Oath 

 The Archimedean Oath, taken by some engineers

Astronomical names 

3600 Archimedes
Archimedes (crater)
Montes Archimedes

Written works of Archimedes 

Archimedes Palimpsest (Numerous written works of Archimedes survive.  This is the only one whose conventional name includes his.)

Other 
 Archimedes, Merlin's owl in T. H. White's novel The Sword in the Stone and its adaptations
Archimedes (bryozoan)
Archimedes-lab.org
Pseudo-Archimedes

Archimedes
Archimedes
Archimedes